The list of Karnataka Rajyotsava Award recipients for the year 2004 is below.

References

Rajyotsava Award